Ilija Najdoski  (born 26 March 1964) is a retired Macedonian footballer who played for Red Star Belgrade and was part of their European Cup victory in 1991.

Club career
He also played in Spain for Real Valladolid in Spain's La Liga and Denizlispor in Turkey's Süper Lig.

International career
Najdoski represented both Yugoslavia and Republic of Macedonia in international matches. Even after Macedonian independence, he was included in the Yugoslav squad for Euro 1992, but the nation would be suspended due to the Yugoslav Wars.

Najdoski later played in the first ever official match of Macedonia, played on 13 October 1993, against Slovenia. His final international was a March 1996 friendly match against Malta.

Personal life
He is the father of Macedonian player Dino Najdoski.

Najdoski is an ethnic Aromanian.

References

External links

Profile at Macedonian Football 
Reprezentacija.rs
Rsssf.com

1964 births
Living people
People from Kruševo
Macedonian people of Aromanian descent
Association football central defenders
Yugoslav footballers
Yugoslavia international footballers
Macedonian footballers
Macedonian expatriate footballers
North Macedonia international footballers
Dual internationalists (football)
FK Pobeda players
FK Vardar players
Red Star Belgrade footballers
Real Valladolid players
Denizlispor footballers
PFC CSKA Sofia players
FC Sion players
Yugoslav First League players
Segunda División players
La Liga players
Süper Lig players
First Professional Football League (Bulgaria) players
Swiss Super League players
Expatriate footballers in Spain
Macedonian expatriate sportspeople in Spain
Expatriate footballers in Turkey
Macedonian expatriate sportspeople in Turkey
Expatriate footballers in Bulgaria
Macedonian expatriate sportspeople in Bulgaria
Expatriate footballers in Switzerland
Macedonian expatriate sportspeople in Switzerland